Hulsoor is a Town and new Taluka in Bidar district in the Indian Southern state of Karnataka. In 2017 the village was declared as taluka.It is 15km from Basvakalyan.

Temples
 Shri veerabhadreswar Temple
 Isampalli Devi
 Goddess Tulaja Bhavani Temple
 Shri Guru Basaveshwar Sanstan Math.
 Shri Santa Raghunath Maharaj math.
 Shri Tori Basavanna Temple
 Sai Baba Temple
 Nullichannayya Temple
 Mahadev Temple
 Maruti Temple
 Hanuman Temple
 Laxmi Temple
 Nageshwar Mandir
 Deghul mahadev mandir

Buddhism
 Buddha vihar

Demographics
 India census, Hulsoor had a population of 11593 with 5868 males and 5725 females.

See also
 Bidar
 Districts of Karnataka

References

External links
 http://Bidar.nic.in/

Villages in Bidar district

Masque.1 Jama masjid bada bazar
       2 Jama masjid momin mahela
       3 Quresh masjid.